Gmina Police is an urban-rural gmina (administrative district) in Police County, West Pomeranian Voivodeship, in north-western Poland, on the German border.

Villages
Apart from the town of Police, Gmina Police contains the villages and settlements of Bartoszewo, Dębostrów, Dobieszczyn, Drogoradz, Gunice, Karpin, Leśno Górne, Mazańczyce, Niekłończyca, Nowa Jasienica, Pienice, Pilchowo, Podbrzezie, Poddymin, Przęsocin, Siedlice, Sierakowo, Stare Leśno, Stary Dębostrów, Tanowo, Tatynia, Trzebież, Trzeszczyn, Turznica, Uniemyśl, Węgornik, Wieńkowo, Witorza, Zalesie and Żółtew.

Neighbouring gminas
Gmina Police is bordered by the city of Szczecin and by the gminas of Dobra, Goleniów, Nowe Warpno and Stepnica. It also borders Germany.

References
Polish official population figures 2006

Police
Police County